Tom McNamara (born 25 April 1989) is an Australian rules footballer who played in the Australian Football League (AFL). Taken at pick number 66 by the Melbourne Demons in the 2007 AFL National Draft, McNamara plays as a tall defender. He was recruited from South Adelaide, and was an AIS/AFL Academy graduate.  He was the youngest player selected in the draft. McNamara made his debut in 2009 and played three games for the season, but at the end of the following season, having failed to play a game in 2010, McNamara was delisted by Melbourne. He was, however, subsequently redrafted by the Demons in the Rookie Draft, only months later. McNamara played only one senior match in 2011 and was again delisted at season's end.

Media career 

Following his delisting at the end of the 2011 Season McNamara moved to Sydney to pursue a media career. He is currently co-host of TABOOS Podcast, discussing AFL football and matters of everyday life. The podcast was rated as one of The Most Underrated Australian Podcasts, before the show went on hiatus following McNamara's move to London in 2016.

Hotel Quarantine Fiasco 

Upon his return to Australia following 6 years in the UK, McNamara was sequestered in a NSW Health Quarantine Hotel Facility in Mascot. Following a positive test on day 14, he was required to remain in quarantine for an additional fourteen days. Despite the NSW Health Department acknowledging that the test was a false positive, and McNamara was not contagious, he was refused permission to leave. Following a media campaign for his release, he was finally granted permission to leave on Day 24 of his quarantine period.

References

External links

1989 births
Living people
Australian rules footballers from Adelaide
Melbourne Football Club players
South Adelaide Football Club players
Casey Demons players
Happy Valley Football Club players
Tiwi Bombers Football Club players
Sandringham Football Club players
People educated at Sacred Heart College, Adelaide